A roundel (not to be confused with the rondel) is a form of  verse used in English language poetry devised by Algernon Charles Swinburne (1837–1909).  It is the Anglo-Norman form corresponding to the French rondeau.  It makes use of refrains, repeated according to a certain stylized pattern.  A roundel consists of nine lines each having the same number of syllables, plus a refrain after the third line and after the last line.  The refrain must be identical with the beginning of the first line: it may be a half-line, and rhymes with the second line.  It has three stanzas and its rhyme scheme is as follows: A B A R ; B A B ; A B A R ; where R is the refrain. 

Swinburne had published a book A Century of Roundels. He dedicated these poems to his friend Christina Rossetti, who then started writing roundels herself, as evidenced by the following examples from her anthology of poetry: Wife to Husband; A Better Resurrection; A Life's Parallels; Today for me; It is finished; From Metastasio.

Examples
Swinburne’s first roundel was called "The roundel": 

    A roundel is wrought as a ring or a starbright sphere, (A)
    With craft of delight and with cunning of sound unsought, (B)
    That the heart of the hearer may smile if to pleasure his ear (A)
        A roundel is wrought. (R)

    Its jewel of music is carven of all or of aught - (B)
    Love, laughter, or mourning - remembrance of rapture or fear - (A)
    That fancy may fashion to hang in the ear of thought. (B)

    As a bird's quick song runs round, and the hearts in us hear (A)
    Pause answer to pause, and again the same strain caught, (B)
    So moves the device whence, round as a pearl or tear, (A)
        A roundel is wrought. (R)

Swinburne’s poem "A baby's death" contains seven roundels. The fourth roundel became the song "Roundel: The little eyes that never knew Light," set to music by the English composer Edward Elgar.

Notes

See also
Rondel (poem)
Rondeau (poetry)

External links

Poetic forms